Campo Testaccio was a multi-use stadium in Rome, Italy. It was initially used as the stadium of A.S. Roma matches, before the team moves to Stadio Nazionale PNF, located in Flaminio quarter in 1940. The capacity of the stadium was 20,000 spectators.

The stadium was rebuilt for use by a local team in 2000, but demolished in 2011.

External links
 Stadium history

Testaccio

1929 establishments in Italy
2011 disestablishments in Italy
Testaccio
A.S. Roma